Davide Petrucci (born 5 October 1991) is an Italian professional footballer who plays as a midfielder for Israeli club Hapoel Be'er Sheva. Born in Rome, he played for Roma until 2008, when he joined English side Manchester United. However, he was unable to break into the first team and, after loan spells with Peterborough United, Royal Antwerp and Charlton Athletic, he joined CFR Cluj in September 2014. He is also capped for Italy at under-19 level.

Club career

A.S. Roma
Born in the San Basilio suburb of Rome, Petrucci began his football career with his local club, Roma, playing in their youth team. During the 2007–08 season, he scored 14 goals in 19 appearances for the Roma youth team, alerting Manchester United to his talents. But the AS Roma offered him a contract worth only around £16,000 per annum, the minimum wage for Italian youth team players, claiming that it would upset the other youth players who had already accepted similar deals if they offered him any more. However, despite the club's claims that he would have been given opportunities in the first team in the 2008–09 season, Petrucci expressed concerns that he had not already been called up. When he asked Roma for some time to consider their offer, the club gave him a three-day deadline. Around this time, Manchester United offered Petrucci a £95,000-a-year contract, which the Italian youngster accepted on 13 June 2008. To comply with FIFA regulations with regard to the international transfer of players under the age of 18, United also offered Petrucci's father, Stefano, a job as well as offering to pay for regular flights back to Italy.

Manchester United
United paid Roma approximately £200,000 in compensation for the transfer, which the Italians were unable to contest as Petrucci was not under contract with them. Italian football regulations state that under-17s may not be signed to professional contracts, meaning that Petrucci would not have been able to sign with Roma until his 17th birthday in October 2008. He travelled to Manchester on 30 June 2008, and began training with Manchester United the following day. At the end of July 2008, Petrucci was part of the Manchester United team that won the Premier (under-17) section of the 2008 Milk Cup. He made regular appearances for the Manchester United under-18 side during the 2008–09 season, and got his first taste of reserve team action on 18 November 2008, when he played 20 minutes of a 2–1 defeat away to Hull City, coming on as a substitute for Antonio Bryan. On 22 January 2009, he made another appearance for the reserve team in the Manchester Senior Cup, scoring the first of the team's three goals in the fourth minute of a 3–0 win over Accrington Stanley.

Loan to Peterborough United
On 9 January 2013, Petrucci joined Peterborough United on loan, he joined along with his teammate Scott Wootton who was signed until the end of the season. He made his debut on 12 January in a 2–1 defeat to Nottingham Forest. He scored his first professional goal in a 2-1 win over Leicester City on 9 February 2013.

Loan to Royal Antwerp
On 2 September 2013, Petrucci was initially loaned to Belgian side Royal Antwerp until the end of the season, but was recalled in January 2014. On 27 March 2014, Petrucci joined Championship side Charlton Athletic on loan until the end of the 2013–14 season.

CFR Cluj
On 8 September 2014, after being named in United's 25-man Premier League squad, Petrucci terminated his contract by mutual consent to secure a move to Romanian side CFR Cluj, six days after the transfer window closed.

Çaykur Rizespor
On 29 August 2016, Petrucci was reported to have joined Turkish side Çaykur Rizespor.

Ascoli
On 13 July 2019, he signed a 2-year contract with Ascoli.

Cosenza
On 5 October 2020 he moved to Cosenza on a one-year contract.

Hapoel Be'er Sheva
On 10 July 2021 Petrucci move to Hapoel Be'er Sheva on a two year deal.

Honours
 Manchester United U21
 Professional Development League (1): 2012–13

CFR Cluj
 Cupa României (1): 2015–16

Hapoel Be'er Sheva
 State Cup (1): 2021–22

References

External links

Profile at ManUtd.com

1991 births
Living people
Footballers from Rome
Italian footballers
A.S. Roma players
Manchester United F.C. players
Peterborough United F.C. players
Royal Antwerp F.C. players
Charlton Athletic F.C. players
CFR Cluj players
Çaykur Rizespor footballers
Ascoli Calcio 1898 F.C. players
Cosenza Calcio players
Hapoel Be'er Sheva F.C. players
English Football League players
Challenger Pro League players
Liga I players
Serie B players
Israeli Premier League players
Italian expatriate footballers
Italy youth international footballers
Association football midfielders
Expatriate footballers in England
Expatriate footballers in Belgium
Expatriate footballers in Romania
Expatriate footballers in Israel
Italian expatriate sportspeople in England
Italian expatriate sportspeople in Belgium
Italian expatriate sportspeople in Romania
Italian expatriate sportspeople in Israel